Best Men is a 1997 American crime comedy film directed by Tamra Davis, and stars Sean Patrick Flanery, Luke Wilson, Andy Dick, Mitchell Whitfield, Fred Ward, Drew Barrymore and Dean Cain.

Plot
Four groomsmen are preparing for a wedding, donning tuxedos. Buzz (Dean Cain), a former soldier, has a few handguns in his tuxedo, Teddy (Andy Dick), a browbeaten house husband, is meticulously getting ready, Sol (Mitchell Whitfield), a former criminal lawyer now specializing in divorce, dresses neatly while Billy (Sean Patrick Flannery), a failing actor, is shown watching a newscast. The reporter describes a recent bank robbery where the robber recited Shakespearean before escaping.

All four meet up, walking towards the prison where Jesse (Luke Wilson) is being released after three years for an unspecified crime. Sol and Jesse have a heated argument as Sol's error as his attorney led to Jesse's incarceration.

Jesse is marrying Hope (Drew Barrymore), surrounded by his best friends. En route to the ceremony, Billy asks them to pull over near a bank. He commences to rob it (he is the Shakespeare robber from the earlier newscast). As he finishes, reciting Shakespeare, Buzz comes in to hurry him up, stopping the robbery, unveiling Billy in the process. The others then walk in, inadvertently creating a hostage situation. When the police arrive, they realise their predicament: they are all accomplices, facing serious prison time.

However, the bank customers bond with the five unlikely robbers. Outside the bank Billy's dad, Sheriff Philips (Fred Ward), demands he surrender, mocking him for being a failure. Billy confronts him, refusing. Inside the bank it's suggested that Billy release some of the hostages. One of them, Gonzo (Brad Dourif) suggests they request a chopper land on the roof so he can fly them to safety. Buzz bonds with Gonzo, a Vietnam veteran, he tells him his life dream was to serve in the military but, being gay, he was not allowed to. Seeing his pain, he gifts Buzz his military jacket. Outside the FBI arrive to take over the hostage negotiation.

Lead agent Hoover (Raymond J. Barry) shows little regard for the hostages, planning to execute the five robbers as they exit the bank. Sheriff Philips approaches the bank and Billy finally confronts his father for being a lousy parent. He realises he was never there for his son. Billy agrees to allow some of the hostages to go, Gonzo amongst them. All of the freed hostages refuse to identify Billy or his friends.

The gang negotiates for Jesse and Hope to be married in the bank; Hoover agrees for a priest to go in and perform the ceremony. During the wedding, the priest turns out to be a federal agent and Teddy and Buzz are shot during a struggle. Teddy, feeling like the bank robbery has woken him up, refuses to be sent to hospital for urgent care but eventually acquiesces. Buzz patches his wound and the guys plot their exit from the bank.

Sol goes outside, negotiating a deal with Hoover to get everyone out. As he re-enters the bank, Hoover orders his men to gun them down. Sol and the guys, with the remaining hostages, leave the bank draped in a giant American flag. The snipers, unable to pick out the guys, refuse to shoot indiscriminately (or shoot at the flag). As everyone enters the bus, Sol tells Jesse he's sorry and Hope forgives him. He then steps off the bus as he announces the deal he brokered involved him surrendering to save Jesse and the guys. Hoover, however, reneges on the deal; Sol holds him at gunpoint so the police cars let the bus go. As the bus leaves, he is shot and killed by the snipers. Sheriff Philips then blocks the feds with his police cruiser, giving Billy time to get away.

As the bus heads to the local airport the feds start to catch up, and Buzz drives it off the main road. Gonzo then appears in a military helicopter and Jesse and Hope escape onto the chopper. However, Billy and Buzz are unable to, remaining behind. Surrounded by the feds, in a final bloody shoot out, the two best friends die but not before Buzz gets off a shot killing Hoover.

The film ends with Jesse and Hope playing with a son some years later on a beach in Mexico.

Cast
 Dean Cain as Sergeant Buzz Thomas  
 Fred Ward as Sheriff Philips 	
 Andy Dick as Teddy Pollack	
 Sean Patrick Flanery as Billy Phillips
 Mitchell Whitfield as Sol Jacobs
 Luke Wilson as Jesse Reilly
 Drew Barrymore as Hope
 Raymond J. Barry as Agent Hoover
 Brad Dourif as John "Gonzo" Coleman
 Tracy Fraim as Cuervo
 Biff Yeager as Mayor Boar
 Art Edler Brown as Agent Carter
 K. K. Dodds as Cindy Vargas
 Kathryn Joosten as Edie
 Dee Maaske as Dorothy

Reception 
On review aggregation website Rotten Tomatoes, the film holds an approval rating of 13% based on 8 reviews.

References

External links
 
 

1997 films
1990s crime comedy films
American heist films
Films directed by Tamra Davis
Orion Pictures films
Films scored by Mark Mothersbaugh
American crime comedy films
1997 comedy films
1990s English-language films
1990s American films